Ma Zhenzhao (born 5 November 1997) is a Chinese judoka.

She won one of the bronze medals in the women's 78 kg event at the 2018 Asian Games held in Jakarta, Indonesia. At the 2019 Asian-Pacific Judo Championships held in Fujairah, United Arab Emirates, she won the silver medal in the women's 78 kg event.

In 2019, she competed in the women's 78 kg event at the World Judo Championships held in Tokyo, Japan.

In 2021, she competed in the women's 78 kg event at the 2020 Summer Olympics in Tokyo, Japan. She was eliminated in her first match by Bernadette Graf of Austria.

References

External links
 
 

Living people
1997 births
People from Binzhou
People from Shandong
Sportspeople from Shandong
Chinese female judoka
Judoka at the 2018 Asian Games
Asian Games bronze medalists for China
Asian Games medalists in judo
Medalists at the 2018 Asian Games
Judoka at the 2020 Summer Olympics
Olympic judoka of China
21st-century Chinese women